Rabah Djenadi (born 3 June 1959) is an Algerian footballer. He played in six matches for the Algeria national football team in 1981 and 1982. He was also named in Algeria's squad for the 1982 African Cup of Nations tournament.

References

External links
 

1959 births
Living people
Algerian footballers
Algeria international footballers
1982 African Cup of Nations players
Footballers from Tizi Ouzou
Association football defenders
21st-century Algerian people
Algerian expatriate footballers
Expatriate footballers in France
JS Kabylie players
FC Istres players
AC Avignonnais players
US Saint-Malo players